Tubercularia is a genus of fungi in the family Nectriaceae. With the change to single name nomenclature in fungi, Tubercularia is now considered a synonym of Nectria.

Species

Tubercularia abrotani
Tubercularia abutilonis
Tubercularia acaciae
Tubercularia aceris
Tubercularia acinorum
Tubercularia aequatoriensis
Tubercularia aesculi
Tubercularia agaves
Tubercularia ailanthi
Tubercularia ampelophila
Tubercularia antarctica
Tubercularia aquifolia
Tubercularia argentina
Tubercularia armeniaca
Tubercularia artemisiae
Tubercularia atomospora
Tubercularia atra
Tubercularia aurantiaca
Tubercularia aurata
Tubercularia australiensis
Tubercularia berberidis
Tubercularia berolinensis
Tubercularia betulae
Tubercularia bicolor
Tubercularia brassicae
Tubercularia bresadolae
Tubercularia buxi
Tubercularia cacao
Tubercularia cactophila
Tubercularia calycanthi
Tubercularia canadensis
Tubercularia cansjerae
Tubercularia carneola
Tubercularia carpogena
Tubercularia castaneae
Tubercularia cattleyicola
Tubercularia cava
Tubercularia celastri
Tubercularia cerasi
Tubercularia cinnabarina
Tubercularia circinata
Tubercularia citri
Tubercularia citrina
Tubercularia coccicola
Tubercularia coccophila
Tubercularia concentrica
Tubercularia conorum
Tubercularia corchori
Tubercularia coryli
Tubercularia crassostipitata
Tubercularia crenulata
Tubercularia cyathoidea
Tubercularia decolorans
Tubercularia depressa
Tubercularia difformis
Tubercularia discoidea
Tubercularia dubia
Tubercularia effusa
Tubercularia endogena
Tubercularia epimyces
Tubercularia ericetorum
Tubercularia erumpens
Tubercularia eryngicola
Tubercularia eucalypti
Tubercularia euonymi
Tubercularia expallens
Tubercularia fasciculata
Tubercularia fatiscens
Tubercularia fici
Tubercularia filicis
Tubercularia flavescens
Tubercularia flavogranulata
Tubercularia floccosa
Tubercularia fraserae
Tubercularia fructicola
Tubercularia fungicola
Tubercularia fungiformis
Tubercularia fusispora
Tubercularia galii
Tubercularia gallarum
Tubercularia garciniae
Tubercularia georginae
Tubercularia geranii
Tubercularia glandicola
Tubercularia granulata
Tubercularia grayana
Tubercularia guaranitica
Tubercularia gyrosa
Tubercularia hamata
Tubercularia harpostipitata
Tubercularia helleboricola
Tubercularia herbarum
Tubercularia hibisci
Tubercularia hirsuta
Tubercularia hirtissima
Tubercularia hoheriae
Tubercularia hollii
Tubercularia hydnoidea
Tubercularia hysterina
Tubercularia insignis
Tubercularia jodinae
Tubercularia kazakhstanica
Tubercularia kmetiana
Tubercularia laburni
Tubercularia lateritia
Tubercularia leguminicola
Tubercularia leguminum
Tubercularia lepidolophae
Tubercularia leptosperma
Tubercularia leucoloma
Tubercularia leucopus
Tubercularia leveillei
Tubercularia libertiana
Tubercularia liceoides
Tubercularia lichenicola
Tubercularia ligustri
Tubercularia longipes
Tubercularia longispora
Tubercularia lutescens
Tubercularia macrozamiae
Tubercularia maculicola
Tubercularia maeshimana
Tubercularia magnoliae
Tubercularia marginata
Tubercularia menispermi
Tubercularia miniata
Tubercularia minor
Tubercularia minuta
Tubercularia minutispora
Tubercularia mori
Tubercularia mutabilis
Tubercularia nigra
Tubercularia nigrescens
Tubercularia nigricans
Tubercularia nigromaculans
Tubercularia nomuriana
Tubercularia olivacea
Tubercularia orchidearum
Tubercularia ossicola
Tubercularia pachypus
Tubercularia paeoniicola
Tubercularia palmae
Tubercularia paraguaya
Tubercularia passerinii
Tubercularia pelargonii
Tubercularia pezizoidea
Tubercularia phacidioides
Tubercularia phyllophila
Tubercularia pinastri
Tubercularia pini
Tubercularia pinophila
Tubercularia pircuniae
Tubercularia polycephala
Tubercularia populi
Tubercularia prostii
Tubercularia pruinosa
Tubercularia pruni
Tubercularia pseudacaciae
Tubercularia pteleae
Tubercularia puerariae
Tubercularia puiggarii
Tubercularia pulverulenta
Tubercularia purpurata
Tubercularia pusilla
Tubercularia pyricola
Tubercularia radicalis
Tubercularia radicicola
Tubercularia ramalinella
Tubercularia rhamni
Tubercularia rhodophila
Tubercularia rhois
Tubercularia ribesii
Tubercularia ricini
Tubercularia robiniae
Tubercularia rosella
Tubercularia rubi
Tubercularia saccharicola
Tubercularia salicis
Tubercularia saligna
Tubercularia sambuci
Tubercularia sarmentorum
Tubercularia schweinfurthii
Tubercularia sessilis
Tubercularia spezazzinii
Tubercularia sphaeroidea
Tubercularia subdiaphana
Tubercularia subpedicellata
Tubercularia sulcata
Tubercularia toxicodendri
Tubercularia trachypus
Tubercularia ulmea
Tubercularia ussuriensis
Tubercularia vaginata
Tubercularia velutipes
Tubercularia velutipites
Tubercularia vermicularis
Tubercularia versicolor
Tubercularia volutella
Tubercularia volvata
Tubercularia zythioides

External links
 

Nectriaceae genera
Nectriaceae